Anna Wappel (born 18 December 1985), known professionally as Anna F., is an Austrian singer-songwriter and actress. She is the frontwoman for the rock band Friedberg.

Life and career

1996–2008: Early life 
Wappel was born in the Austrian town of Friedberg. She began singing in childhood, and cites the first records of her parents including Bob Dylan, Alanis Morissette and Joan Baez. She studied English and Italian philosophy and literature in Graz and worked for ATV on the weekends.

2009–2011: Career beginnings, For Real

In the summer of 2009, Anna was an opening act for Lenny Kravitz's European tour. She won the "Pop" category at the Amadeus Austrian Music Awards 2009.

She published her debut album, For Real, on 5 February 2010. The album reached third place on the Austrian music charts and was awarded a golden certification. Wappel toured throughout Austria, including the Donauinselfest.

2012–present: Acting debut, King in the Mirror, and DNA
In 2012, Wappel made her acting debut in Dito Tsintsadze's feature film, Invasion which premiered on 30 June 2012 at the Filmfest München.

Wappel moved to Prenzlauer Berg in Berlin in 2012. She signed to Polydor/Island (Universal Music Group) in 2013. In August 2013, Anna released DNA as her first song from the upcoming album King in the Mirror. The music video was released on 3 August 2013. She performed on Jan Böhmermann's television show Lateline.

King in the Mirror was released in February 2014. Wappel was the opening act for James Blunt's tour in Austria, Germany, Italy and Switzerland.

In preparation for the Eurovision Song Contest 2015, Anna was a part of the ORF team which searched for potential candidates to represent Austria, acting as a coach to the musicians.

In 2017, Anna began recording a new album with producer Daniel Brandt, whom she was also dating at the time.

Discography

Studio albums

Singles

Filmography

Film

Awards and nominations

References

External links 

 

1985 births
21st-century Austrian actresses
21st-century Austrian women singers
Austrian singer-songwriters
Austrian television actresses
Living people
People from Hartberg District